Harry Wilbur Griswold (May 19, 1886 – July 4, 1939) was a member of the United States House of Representatives from Wisconsin.

Born in West Salem, Wisconsin, he was educated in the public schools and took courses in the agricultural college at University of Wisconsin–Madison. Griswold was in the agriculture profession specializing in cattle breeding. He served on the West Salem Board of Education and was in the Wisconsin State Senate 1933–1937. In 1938, Griswold was elected as a Republican to serve in the 76th United States Congress as the representative of Wisconsin's 3rd congressional district and served until he died in office in Washington, D.C. a few months later.

See also
 List of United States Congress members who died in office (1900–49)

Notes

External links

People from West Salem, Wisconsin
School board members in Wisconsin
Republican Party Wisconsin state senators
1886 births
1939 deaths
Republican Party members of the United States House of Representatives from Wisconsin
20th-century American politicians
University of Wisconsin–Madison College of Agricultural and Life Sciences alumni